Elizabeth Ann Scarborough (born March 23, 1947) is an American writer of science fiction and fantasy and Registered Nurse who lives in Port Townsend, Washington.  She has published over 40 novels, as well as collaborating with Anne McCaffrey on multiple series.

Biography 

Elizabeth Ann Scarborough grew up in Kansas City, Kansas.  She was earned a RN from Bethany Hospital School of Nursing in 1968.  She was a practicing nurse for well over a decade, including 5 years as an RN in the US Army, one year of which she served in Vietnam during the eponymous war.  Her writing career began in 1982 with the publication of her first novel, following which she entered the University of Alaska, earning a BA Magna Cum Laude in 1987. She is still an active novelist  publishing at least one novel in every year after 1986, except for 1990, 2011, 2013, and 2014 (in which she published short story collections instead). She now publishes the bulk of her independent work through Gypsy Shadow Publishers.

Awards 

Scarborough won a Nebula Award in 1989 for her novel The Healer's War

Works

Non-fiction
"The Dragon Lady's Songs", from Dragonwriter, 2013
"Nursing Our Wounds", from Health Progress, 2016

Collaborations with Anne McCaffrey

 The Acorna Series, 1999-2007
 Petaybee Series, 1993-2008

Argonia/Songs from the Seashell Archives Quintet 

Vol. 1: Song of Sorcery, 1982
Vol. 2: The Unicorn Creed, 1983
Vol. 3: Bronwyn's Bane, 1983
Vol. 4: The Christening Quest, 1985
Vol. 5: The Dragon, the Witch and the Railroad, 2015
Vol. 6: The Redundant Dragons, 2019

Drastic Dragon series 

Vol. 1: The Drastic Dragon of Draco, Texas, 1986
Vol. 2: The Goldcamp Vampire, 1987

The Songkiller Saga 

Vol. 1: Phantom Banjo, 1991
Vol. 2: Picking the Ballad’s Bones, 1991
Vol. 3: Strum Again?, 1992

Nothing Sacred series 

Vol. 1: Nothing Sacred, 1991
Vol. 2: Last Refuge, 1992

Godmother series 

Vol. 1: The Godmother, 1994
Vol. 2: The Godmother’s Apprentice, 1995
Vol. 3: The Godmother’s Web, 1998

Cleopatra series 

Vol. 1: Channeling Cleopatra, 2002
Vol. 2: Cleopatra 7.2, 2004

Spam the Cat series 
Vol. 1 Spam Vs the Vampire, 2011
Vol. 2 Father Christmas or Spam the Cat's First Christmas 
Vol. 3 The Tour Bus of Doom or Spam and the Zombie Apocalyps-o

Standalone novels 

The Harem of Aman Akbar, 1984
The Healer's War, 1988 (Nebula Award for Best Novel 1989)
Carol for Another Christmas, 1996
The Lady in the Loch, 1998

Anthologies 

Space Opera, with Anne McCaffrey, 1996
Warrior Princesses, with Martin H. Greenberg, 1998
Past Lives, Present Tense, 1999
Vampire Slayers: Stories of Those Who Dare to Take Back the Night, with Martin H. Greenberg, 1999

Collections 
"Shifty", 2013
"Nine Tails O' Cats", 2011
"Scarborough Fair and Other Stories", 2003
"Introduction"
"The Mummies of the Motorway", 2001
"Final Vows", 1998
"Whirlwinds", 1998
"Worse Than the Curse", 2000
"Boon Companion", 2002
"Long Time Coming Home", with Rick Reaser, 2002
"Mu Mao and the Court Oracle", 2001
"Don’t Go Out in Holy Underwear or Victoria’s Secret or Space Panties!!!", 1996
"The Invisible Woman’s Clever Disguise", 2000
"A Rare Breed", 1995
"Scarborough Fair", 1996

Other short fiction 

"Milk from a Maiden's Breast", 1987
"Wolf From the Door", 1988
"The Elephant In-Law", 1988
"The Camelot connection", 1988
"Bastet's Blessing", 1989
"The Castle's Haunted Parking Lot", 1991
"The Queen's Cat's Tale", 1991
"The Dragon of Tollin", 1992
"Candy's Wonder Cure", 1993
"The Cat-Quest of Mu Mao the Magnificent", 1994
"Jean-Pierre and the Gator-Maid", 1994
"The Stone of War and the Nightingale's Egg", 1995
"First Communion", 1995
"Born Again", 1996
"The Snake Charm
"The Attack of the Avenging Virgins", 1998
"Debriefing the Warrior/Princess", 1998
"The Fatal Wager", 1998
"Final Vows", 1998
"Worse Than The Curse", 2000
"The Mummies of the Motorway", 2001
"Jewels Beyond Price", 2005
"Spam and the Sasquatch", 2015
"Spam, the Spooks, and the UPS Bandit" 2015

References

External links 

 Home and Biography at the Internet Archive, archived March 2016

 
 Interview with Elizabeth Ann Scarborough and Anne McCaffrey about co-authoring two books, A DISCUSSION WITH National Authors on Tour TV Series, Episode #105 (1994)

1947 births
Living people
20th-century American novelists
21st-century American novelists
Anne McCaffrey
American fantasy writers
United States Army personnel of the Vietnam War

American female military personnel of the Vietnam War
American science fiction writers
American women short story writers
American women novelists
Nebula Award winners
Women science fiction and fantasy writers
Writers from Port Townsend, Washington
20th-century American women writers
21st-century American women writers
Writers from Kansas City, Kansas
20th-century American short story writers
21st-century American short story writers
Novelists from Kansas
Novelists from Washington (state)
United States Army soldiers
Women in the United States Army